Russula reddellii is a fungus in the family, Russulaceae, found in leaf litter in "open,dry forests of Acacia, Allocasuarina, Eucalyptus, Lophostemon and Syncarpia" in Queensland.

It was first described in 2007 by Teresa Lebel and Jennifer Tonkin.

References

reddellii
Taxa named by Teresa Lebel
Fungi described in 2007